Mycomya cinerascens  is a Palearctic species of  'fungus gnats' in the family Mycetophilidae. Mycomya cinerascens  is found in forest or wooded areas where the larvae develop  in fruiting bodies of Stereum, Thelephora terrestris and Cortinarius sp..Besides fruiting bodies the species has been collected with emergence traps over beech logs and stumps, alder and spruce stumps.

References

External links
Images representing  Mycomya at BOLD

Mycetophilidae
Taxa named by Pierre-Justin-Marie Macquart